Jeremy Broun is a British furniture designer maker, writer, film maker and musician.

His Caterpillar Rocking Chair in 1984 was described as, 'visually stunning, a good combination of colour, structure and practicality... and has the advantage of being a truly original idea : just as Saarinen and his pedestal chairs converted four chairlegs into one' (An Encyclopedia of Chairs - The Apple Press).

He won a Winston Churchill Travel Scholarship to Sweden, Finland and Italy in 1979 and in the same year was elected a Fellow of The Society of Designer Craftsmen, the original Arts and Crafts Exhibition Society founded by William Morris. Since 1980 he has been a member of the Crafts Council Index of Selected Makers.

He has exhibited at the Royal Society of Arts and the Ars Nova Museum in Finland.

His work was included in the 'First Sale of Contemporary British Crafts' at Sotheby's in 1980 and in 2002 at the Centenary exhibition celebrating the Hill House designed by Charles Rennie Mackintosh. In 1989 he gained The Worshipful Company of Furniture Makers Ambrose Heal Award for his craft documentary films. He has written numerous articles on woodworking and design including "Furniture Today" and a History of (Furniture) Designer Makers in 2005. In 2006 Broun was voted 'Professional Woodworker of the year 2005' by The Woodworker magazine. In 2007 Broun set up his own publishing company and launched The Revised Bespoke edition of his first book 'The Incredible Router'. In 2008 he was invited to become a freelance inspector for The British Accreditation Council for independent further and higher education. As a musician Jeremy plays the electro-acoustic guitars that he makes and can occasionally be heard busking on the streets of his home town Bath and has performed at the Bath Fringe Festival. In 2009 he was elected a Fellow of The Royal Society of Arts and in 2015 he resigned expressing concern that he felt the Society had drifted from its core aims to promote the Arts and Manufacturing. Since 2010 he has been a judge for the Alan Peters Award for Excellence for furniture makers under 30 years of age.

List of selected books by Jeremy Broun
Electric Woodwork: Power Tool Woodworking
The Encyclopedia of Woodworking Techniques
The Incredible Router
Woodwork Now: The Best of Old and New Methods
The Revised Bespoke Edition of The Incredible Router" + CD-Rom. Published 2007.Alan Peters - The Makers' Maker. Published 2009.

References

External links 
 
 

British furniture designers
Living people
Year of birth missing (living people)
People educated at Abbotsholme School